Dejang-e Bala (also Romanized as Dejang-e Bālā) is a village in Taftan-e Jonubi Rural District, Nukabad District, Khash County, Sistan and Baluchestan Province, Iran. At the 2006 census, its population was 284, in 55 families.

References 

Populated places in Khash County